The 2006 Philadelphia Soul season was the third season of the Philadelphia Soul. The Soul finished 9–7 on the season and received their first-ever playoff berth.

Schedule

Playoffs

External links
2006 Schedule on arenafan.com

Philadelphia Soul Season, 2006
Philadelphia Soul seasons
2006 in sports in Pennsylvania
2006 in Philadelphia